Hungarian Fencer of the Year awards are granted each year since 1964, Hungarian Fencing Federation (MVSZ) considers the winners.

List of winners

Sources

 Antal Zoltán–Sass Tibor: A magyar sport kézikönyve. Az év sportolói (1958–1981), 866. o., Sport Kiadó, Budapest, 1983. 
A magyar sport évkönyve (1974-1993)
Magyar sportévkönyv (1994-2010)

References

External links 
Magyar Vívó Szövetség (official website)

Fencing in Hungary
Fencers
Awards established in 1964
1964 establishments in Hungary